Nurettin Özsü also known as Hussein Nureddin Bey or Hussein Nureddin Pasha (1879 in Istanbul – June 9, 1937) was an officer of the Ottoman Army and a general of the Turkish Army.

See also
List of high-ranking commanders of the Turkish War of Independence

Sources

External links

1879 births
1937 deaths
Military personnel from Istanbul
Ottoman Military Academy alumni
Ottoman Army officers
Ottoman military personnel of the Italo-Turkish War
Ottoman military personnel of the Balkan Wars
Ottoman military personnel of World War I
Turkish military personnel of the Greco-Turkish War (1919–1922)
Turkish Army generals
Recipients of the Liakat Medal
Recipients of the Medal of Independence with Red Ribbon (Turkey)